Nehemiah Walter (born December 1663, Youghal, County Cork, Ireland – died 17 September 1750, Roxbury, Boston, British Colonial America) was a clergyman. He came with his father, Thomas, to the American colonies in 1679, settling in the Boston area. He was graduated at Harvard in 1684. After living for a time in Nova Scotia, became colleague to John Eliot, the apostle to the Indians.  He was minister of Roxbury, Massachusetts from 17 October 1688 until his death. 

Walter married a daughter of Increase Mather. He published The body of death anatomized: A brief essay concerning the sorrows and the desires of the regenerate, upon their sense of indwelling sin (Boston, 1707); Practical Discourses on the Holiness of Heaven (1726); and a posthumous volume of Sermons on Isaiah LV (1755).

References

1663 births
1750 deaths
Harvard University alumni
American people of English descent
American clergy of Irish descent
American religious writers